Country Home is a country lifestyle magazine, published by Meredith Corporation. The magazine features decorating and collecting, food and entertaining, fashion and well-being, travel and shopping. Country Home provides ideas and inspiration for readers who live a country lifestyle, or aspire to create one, in city lofts, farmhouses, suburban colonials, getaway cottages. Country Home, which was launched in 1984, was published 10 times a year and each issue has over 8.3 million readers. LuAnn Brandsen and Carol Sheehan served as the editors-in-chief of the magazine.

See also 
 Farm & Fireside, which was published under the title The Country Home in the 1930s.

References

  Country Home mission statement, 2006
  Fall 2006 Mediamark Research Inc. (MRI) statistics

External links
 Country Home Web site
 JunkMarket Web site
 Home Remodeling Plan
 Leslie Segrete's Web site
 Danny Seo's Web site
 Matthew Mead's Web site

Lifestyle magazines published in the United States
Monthly magazines published in the United States
Defunct magazines published in the United States
Magazines established in 1984
Magazines disestablished in 2009
Defunct Meredith Corporation magazines
Magazines published in Iowa
Mass media in Des Moines, Iowa